Union Law School was a law school located in Easton, Pennsylvania. It was founded in 1846 by Washington McCartney, and incorporated by the Pennsylvania legislature in 1854 as "Union Law School"; and was still operating at the time of his death in 1856. Its alumni included Congressman Philip Johnson and Wisconsin state senator Robert L. D. Potter.

As Potter graduated in the spring of 1857, a historian in 2000 dismissed Union as "a one-man operation that died with him" [i.e., McCartney].

References 

Law schools in Pennsylvania
Easton, Pennsylvania
Educational institutions established in 1846
1846 establishments in Pennsylvania
Defunct law schools